| tries = {{#expr:
 4 + 3 + 7 + 0 + 3 + 3
 + 4 + 5 + 1 + 12 + 4 + 4
 + 9 + 0 + 5 + 3
 + 2 + 4 + 4 + 3
 + 2 + 6 + 6 + 2
}}
| top point scorer =  Manuel Ordas (55 points)
| top try scorer =  Akaki Tabutsadze (6 tries) 
| previous year = 2021
| previous tournament = 2021 Rugby Europe Championship
| next year = 2023
| next tournament = 2023 Rugby Europe Championship
}}
The 2022 Rugby Europe Championship was the sixth Rugby Europe Championship, the annual rugby union for the top European national teams outside the Six Nations Championship, and the 52nd edition of the competition (including all its previous incarnations as the FIRA Tournament, Rugby Union European Cup, FIRA Nations Cup, FIRA Trophy and European Nations Cup). 

The 2022 Championship was contested by Georgia, The Netherlands, Portugal, Romania, Russia, and Spain.

Georgia enter the tournament as defending champions. They topped the table after winning all of their matches in the 2021 tournament, claiming their 13th title and 10th Grand Slam as a result.

As in several other sports, Russia were disqualified after Week 3 due to the 2022 Russian invasion of Ukraine.

This year's edition of the Rugby Europe Championship doubles as the second year of the 2023 Rugby World Cup qualifiers for the European region. The winner and runner-up of the two-year cycle automatically qualify for the tournament as Europe 1 and Europe 2 respectively while the team in third place advances to the final qualification tournament as Europe 3.

Participants

Table

Fixtures

Week 1

Touch judges:
George Selwood (England)
Mike Woods (England)
Television match official:
Rowan Kitt (England)

Touch judges:
Manuel Bottino (Italy)
Leonardo Masini (Italy)
Television match official:
Emanuele Tomo (Italy)

Touch judges:
Ludovic Cayre (France)
Stéphane Boyer (France)
Television match official:
Denis Grenouillet (France)

Week 2

Touch judges:
 Federico Vedovelli (Italy)
 Filippo Bertelli (Italy)
Television match official:
Stefano Roscini (Italy)

Touch judges:
Cédric Marchat (France)
Stéphane Crapoix (France)
Television match official:
Patrick Pechambert (France)

Touch judges:
 Oisin Quinn (Ireland)
Nigel Correll (Ireland)
Television match official:
Leo Colgan (Ireland)

Week 3

Touch judges:
 Riccardo Angelucci (Italy)
Simone Boaretto (Italy)
Television match official:
Alan Falzone (Italy)

Touch judges:
 Graeme Ormiston (Scotland)
Jonny Perriam (Scotland)
Television match official:
Neil Paterson (Scotland)

 Georgia awarded 4 points.

Week 4

 Netherlands awarded 4 points.

Touch judges:
Gareth Newman (Wales)
Mark Butcher (Wales)
Television match official:
Elgan Williams (Wales)

Touch judges:
David Beun (France)
Christophe Bultet (France)
Television match official:
Eric Briquet-Campin (France)

Week 5

Touch judges:  Ru Campbell (Scotland)  Bob Nevins (Scotland) Television match official: Andrew Mac Menemy (Scotland)

Portugal awarded 4 points.

Touch judges:  Ben Breakspear (Wales) Ian Davies (Wales) Television match official: Jon Mason (Wales)

International broadcasters

See also
 Rugby Europe International Championships
 Antim Cup
 Kiseleff Cup

References

2021–22 Rugby Europe International Championships
Rugby Europe Championship
2022 rugby union tournaments for national teams
2021–22 in European rugby union
2022 in Dutch sport
2022 in Georgian sport
2022 in Portuguese sport
2022 in Romanian sport
2022 in Russian sport
2022 in Spanish sport
Rugby Europe Championship
Rugby Europe Championship
Sports events affected by the 2022 Russian invasion of Ukraine